The Richland Parish School Board is an entity responsible for the operation of public schools in Richland Parish, Louisiana, United States. It is headquartered in the town of Rayville.

Schools

High schools
Grades 9-12
Delhi High School  (Delhi)
Mangham High School  (Mangham)
Rayville High School  (Rayville)

Middle/Junior High Schools
Grades 5-8
Delhi Middle School (Delhi)
Mangham Junior High School (Mangham)
Rayville Junior High School (Rayville)

Elementary schools
Grades PK-4
Delhi Elementary School (Delhi)
Grades PK-5
Mangham Elementary School (Mangham)
Rayville Elementary School (Rayville)
Grades K-8
Holly Ridge Elementary School (Unincorporated area)
Start Elementary School (Unincorporated area)

Alternative schools
Richland Alternative School (Unincorporated area)

Demographics
Total Students (as of October 1, 2007): 3,397
Gender
Male: 52%
Female: 48%
Race/Ethnicity
African American: 53.14%
White: 45.92%
Hispanic: 0.74%
Asian: 0.12%
Native American: 0.09%
Socio-Economic Indicators
At-Risk: 74.27%
Free Lunch: 68.44%
Reduced Lunch: 5.83%

See also
List of school districts in Louisiana

References

External links
Richland Parish School Board - Official site.

School districts in Louisiana
Education in Richland Parish, Louisiana